Paul Bastien Lasne (born 16 January 1989) is a French professional footballer who plays as a midfielder for Ligue 2 club Paris FC.

Career
Born in Saint-Cloud, Lasne broke into the first team squad at Bordeaux in 2009. He was loaned out to Châteauroux in January 2010. He left them at the end of the season having played nine games in total. At the start of the 2010–11 season he was loaned out again, to AC Ajaccio. He made his debut for Ajaccio on 13 September in a 1–1 draw with Évian Thonon Gaillard.

On 27 June 2011, he signed a permanent deal lasting until June 2014 at Ajaccio.

After his contract with Ajaccio expired in June 2014, Lasne joined Montpellier HSC with a four-year contract.

On 27 June 2022, Lasne signed a two-year deal with Paris FC.

Career statistics

Club

Honours
Bordeaux
Trophée des Champions: 2009

References

External links

1989 births
Living people
Sportspeople from Saint-Cloud
Association football midfielders
French footballers
FC Girondins de Bordeaux players
LB Châteauroux players
AC Ajaccio players
Montpellier HSC players
Stade Brestois 29 players
Paris FC players
Ligue 1 players
Ligue 2 players
Championnat National 3 players
Footballers from Hauts-de-Seine